Samar class of offshore patrol vessels are series of five ships built by Goa Shipyard Limited, Vasco da Gama, Goa for the Indian Coast Guard.

Design and description
The construction of vessels was ordered in April 1990 and these ships are half-sisters to seven  units in the Indian Navy. A total of twelve were originally planned and then cut to six. The vessels are intended for offshore patrol duties for the protection of oil platforms and the Indian exclusive economic zone.

The Samar-class ships feature an Integrated Bridge System (IBS), Integrated Machinery Control System (IMCS), high power External Fire Fighting System, two Indian-built 30 mm gun mounts and one 76 mm OTO Melara dual-purpose gun. Besides, the ships are provided with a BEL-made onboard day/night infrared surveillance system to detect elusive targets which can evade radar detection due to their small radar cross-section (RCS) or higher sea state.

Capability
Each ship carries a single Dhruv Advanced Light Helicopter (ALH), with dedicated hangar and flight deck, and five high speed boats.
The vessels also have towing capacity for salvage and Inmarsat satellite communications. They have accommodation for a crew of 12 officers and 112 enlisted sailors. Additional accommodation has also been provided for passengers.

List of ships

See also

References

External links
 Samar class at Harpoondatabases.com
 Goa Shipyard Product History

Patrol ship classes
Indian Coast Guard
Ships of the Indian Coast Guard